Çıvgalar is a village in the District of Korkuteli, Antalya Province, Turkey. The village is located 520 kilometers south-west of the capital city Ankara.

References

Villages in Korkuteli District